"Waiting Outside the Lines" is the debut single of American pop rock singer Greyson Chance.  The song was written by Aaron Michael Cox and produced by Da Internz and Ron Fair.  It was released exclusively to iTunes on October 26, 2010.  The CD single was later released on December 14, 2010 under eleveneleven, Maverick Records, and Geffen Records .  It also contained a studio version of cover hits from Lady Gaga and Augustana. The official remix features vocals from Filipina pop and R&B singer Charice. The song also appeared on the 2011 compilation album Now That's What I Call Music! 37

The song's accompanying music video was directed by Sanaa Hamri.

Track listing
Digital download

"Waiting Outside the Lines" – 3:52

US & UK CD single

Charts

Release history

References

2010 debut singles
Greyson Chance songs
Pop ballads
Song recordings produced by Ron Fair
2010 songs
Songs written by Eric Bellinger
Song recordings produced by Da Internz
Maverick Records singles
Songs written by Greyson Chance

2010 singles